Wolfgang Anheisser (1 December 1929 – 5 January 1974) was a German operatic baritone. He was the leading baritone at the Cologne Opera from 1964 until his tragic death on stage there ten years later, where he covered the major roles for his voice part. From 1968, he was simultaneously a member of the Berlin State Opera in East Berlin. He appeared internationally, taking part in a world premiere at the Salzburg Festival and singing throughout Europe and beyond.

Life 
Anheisser was born in Cologne, the son of the musicologist and Mozart scholar Siegfried Anheisser. He received his first singing education with his mother, an opera singer. After his Abitur, he studied voice at the Musikhochschule Freiburg from 1954, where he was trained by Fritz Harlan, among others. He then attended the Conservatorio Verdi in Milan. From 1955 to 1960, he studied singing and musicology at the Witwatersrand University in Johannesburg, with Anni Hartmann. He already performed there during his studies.

After his return to Germany, he made his debut as Nardo in Mozart's La finta giardiniera at the Bavarian State Opera in Munich in 1961. He worked at the Gelsenkirchen municipal theatre from 1963, and was first baritone (Erster Bariton) at the Cologne Opera from 1964, engaged at the Berlin State Opera simultaneously from 1968. In Berlin, he appeared in the title role of Rossini's Der Barbier von Sevilla in 1968, staged by Ruth Berghaus, and alongside  Sylvia Geszty as Rosina and Peter Schreier as the Count. Anheisser performed leading roles in the German and Italian repertoire, including Mozart's Count Almaviva, Guglielmo and Papageno, the title role of Lortzing's Zar und Zimmermann, Posa in Verdi's Don Carlos and Wolfram in Wagner's Tannhäuser, among others. He appeared as a guest internationally, including Lisbon and the Houston Opera. He performed in the world premiere of Orff's De temporum fine comoedia at the Salzburg Festival on 20 August 1973.

Anheisser was featured in recordings of broadcaster Westdeutscher Rundfunk (WDR), such as a 1967 production of Donizetti's Anna Bolena, as Rochefort alongside Teresa Żylis-Gara in the title role and Karl Ridderbusch as Henry VIII, conducted by Alberto Erede.

Anheisser died in Cologne in 1974 in an accident at the Cologne Opera. In a New Year's Day performance of Carl Millöcker's Der Bettelstudent with him in the title role, he fell from a balcony onto the stage when the security device for a jump failed. He was buried at the Melaten Cemetery in Cologne.

Opera roles 
His roles included:
 Title role in Handel's Giulio Cesare
 Kreon in Haydn's Orpheus und Eurydike (Cologne, 1968)
 Nardo in Mozart's La finta giardiniera. Munich Opera Festival, 1961
 Figaro in Rossini's Der Barbier von Sevilla
 Almaviva in Mozart's Le nozze di Figaro
 Papageno in Mozart's Die Zauberflöte
 Wolfram in Wagner's Tannhäuser
 Masetto in Mozart's Don Giovanni
 Guglielmo in Mozart's Così fan tutte
 Eberbach in Lortzing's Der Wildschütz
 Zar in Lortzing's Zar und Zimmermann
 Germont in Verdi's La traviata
 Sharpless in Puccini's Madama Butterfly
 Posa in Verdi's Don Carlos
 Valentin in Gounod's Faust
 Escamillo in Bizet's Carmen

References

External links 
 Henriette Anheisser: Zum Andenken an Wolfgang Anheisser
 
 
 Wolfgang Anheisser (baritone) Bach Cantatas Website

German operatic baritones
1929 births
1974 deaths
musicians from Cologne